Keyser is a Dutch, Afrikaans and Norwegian surname meaning "emperor" or an Anglicized form of cognate surnames like German Kaiser. It may refer to:

Places
 Keyser, Ontario, Canada
 Keyser, West Virginia, United States, a city named after William Keyser (see below)
 Keyser Formation, a limestone bedrock unit in the Eastern United States named for Keyser, West Virginia
 Keyser Creek, a stream in Pennsylvania, United States
 Keyser Township, DeKalb County, Indiana, United States

People
Abraham Keyser, Jr. (1784–1873), New York State Treasurer 1824–1838
Agnes Keyser (1852–1941), English humanitarian, courtesan and longtime mistress to Edward VII
Andre Keyser (1938–2010), South African palaeontologist and geologist
Brenda Keyser (born 1950s), Canadian (Manitoba) judge
Brian Keyser (born 1969), American baseball pitcher
Cassius Jackson Keyser (1862–1947), American mathematician
Charles Keyser (1871–1965), Australian politician
Charles Edward Keyser (1847–1929), British stockbroker and church architecture expert
Charles L. Keyser (born 1930s), American Episcopal bishop
Chris Keyser (born c.1960), American businesswoman
Christian Keyser (1877–1961), Bavarian Lutheran missionary of the Neuendettelsau Mission Society
Christopher Keyser (born 1960), American screenwriter and producer
Donald Keyser (born 1943), American diplomat and spy for Taiwan
Ephraim Keyser (1850–1937), American sculptor
Erich Keyser (1893–1968), German nazi writer and historian
Ernest Wise Keyser (1876–1959), American sculptor 
F. Ray Keyser, Jr. (1927–2015), American (Vermont) lawyer and politician
F. Ray Keyser, Sr. (1898–2001), American (Vermont) politician, lawyer, and judge
Gerard Keyser (1910–1980), Dutch football goalkeeper
Harriette A. Keyser (1841-1936), American industrial reformer and author
Jacques Keyser (1885–1954), Dutch/French middle-distance runner
Jason Keyser (born 1980s), American heavy metal singer
Johan Michael Keyser (1749–1810), Norwegian theologian and priest
Louisa Keyser (1845? - 1925), Native American basket weaver
Peter Dirck Keyser (1835–1897), American ophthalmologist
Pieter Dirkszoon Keyser (1540 – 1596), Dutch navigator
Ragnhild Keyser (1889–1943), Norwegian painter
Ralph S. Keyser (1883–1955), American Marine Corps marksman
Rosy Keyser (born 1974), American abstract painter and sculptor
Rudolf Keyser (1803-1864), Norwegian historian, archaeologist and educator
Samuel Jay Keyser (born 1935), American theoretical linguist 
Vladimir Keyser (1878–?), Russian fencer
William Keyser (1835–1904), American railroad executive

Characters
Keyser Söze, a character in the 1995 film The Usual Suspects

See also
De Keyser, Belgian surname
Keijser, Dutch surname
Keizer (disambiguation)
Kaiser (disambiguation)
Kyser, Anglicized surname

Dutch-language surnames